Paul Hough is an English film director. He is best known for creating and directing The Backyard. He is the son of director John Hough.

In 2007 he directed the short film The Angel. In 2012, he directed thriller The Human Race, which premiered at the Fantasia International Film Festival in Montreal, and was released worldwide in 2013 by Anchor Bay.

Hough directed a musical special for television series League of Steam called "The Invitation To Armageddon". The episode was nominated for various awards and won awards at DragonCon and WebAsia. He also directed the music video "Enemy" for Chris Jericho's band Fozzy.

Awards and nominations

References

External links
 
 Official Website

Year of birth missing (living people)
Living people
English film directors